Shuravash-e Olya (also Romanized as Shūravāsh-e ‘Olyā) is a village in Bazan Rural District, in the Central District of Javanrud County, Kermanshah Province, Iran. At the 2006 census, its population was 37, in 5 families.

References 

Populated places in Javanrud County